Stephen Baldwin Jr. is an American  politician and former Democratic member of the West Virginia Senate, representing the 10th district from 2016 to 2022. During the 85th Legislature, Baldwin served as the Senate Minority Leader. Baldwin was the third Minority Leader since the Republicans took the majority in the Senate in 2014.

Prior to his appointment to the State Senate, Baldwin represented the 42nd District in the West Virginia House of Delegates, and was a member of the Greenbrier County Board of Education.

In 2022, Baldwin lost re-election to Vince Deeds, becoming one of only two state legislative leaders to lose re-election in 2022.

Political career

West Virginia House of Delegates 
In 2016, Baldwin ran unopposed for the Democratic nomination in the 42nd House District, which encompassed the majority of Greenbrier County, as well as portions of Monroe and Summers counties. Baldwin faced incumbent Delegates George Ambler and Ray Canterbury in the general election. Running on his strength in his home Greenbrier County, Baldwin secured first place in the two-member district, ousting incumbent Republican delegate Ray Canterbury in the three-way race.

West Virginia Senate 
After serving just 10 months in the House of Delegates, Baldwin was appointed by Governor Jim Justice in October 2017 to a West Virginia Senate seat from District 10. He replaced state senator Ron Miller, who resigned to take a role in the Justice administration advising on agricultural issues.

2018 

Baldwin ran for a full term in 2018 and was unopposed in the Democratic primary. Baldwin faced his former colleague, Republican Delegate George Ambler in the November general election, who he beat 53-47%.

2022 

Baldwin ran for reelection in 2022, running unopposed in the Democratic primary. In the general election, Baldwin faced former West Virginia State Trooper Vince Deeds and Independent Candidate Aaron Ransom and lost to Deeds 38-59%.

References 

1982 births
21st-century American politicians
American Presbyterian ministers
Democratic Party members of the West Virginia House of Delegates
Democratic Party West Virginia state senators
Living people
People from Pinehurst, North Carolina
People from Ronceverte, West Virginia
Presbyterians from West Virginia
Queens College, City University of New York alumni
School board members in West Virginia
Vanderbilt University alumni